Robert Wilson Flavell (1 September 1921 – 18 March 2005) was a Scottish football player and manager. His senior playing career, which was delayed by the Second World War, had its high point at Dundee, where he won two Scottish League Cup winners' medals in consecutive years. Flavell won two caps for the Scotland national football team, both in 1947. He later became a manager of Ayr United, St Mirren and Albion Rovers.

Playing career
Flavell was born in Annathill, North Lanarkshire in 1921. He joined the senior game by signing for Airdrie in 1937 as a teenager, but only played two seasons before the war broke out; he had to wait until the 1946–47 season to make another league appearance. During the conflict, Flavell had made guest appearances for both Arsenal and Tottenham. When the Scottish Football League resumed in 1946, Flavell scored over a goal per game for Airdrie and won his two caps for Scotland, which convinced Heart of Midlothian to pay £10,000 to acquire his services.

Flavell again scored frequently at Hearts, but he became a football outcast on 12 June 1949 by signing for Millonarios, of the breakaway Colombian league, a move that Hearts manager Dave McLean said meant he would "never play for Hearts again". Flavell played alongside the legendary Alfredo Di Stefano in Bogota, but at the end of the Colombian season returned to Scotland in December 1950; he was punished heavily for his actions in going to Colombia, attracting far stronger sanctions than English players who had made a similar move. He was fined £150 – then a record fine for a Scottish player – and suspended from playing until May 1951. He was transfer-listed by Hearts in February 1951, before signing for Dundee in April, making his debut for the club in a Dewar Shield game against St Johnstone on 5 May 1951.
Flavell scored goals in both the 1951 and 1952 Scottish League Cup Finals, which helped Dundee win the cup in successive years. He also played in the 1952 Scottish Cup Final, which ended in a 4–0 defeat by Motherwell. He also played for Kilmarnock
and St Mirren before retiring as a player.

Coaching career
Flavell had five stints as a manager at three clubs, starting with Ayr United in 1961. He quickly moved to St Mirren, whom he guided to the 1962 Scottish Cup Final. He briefly returned to Ayr, before having two spells at Albion Rovers. Flavell later became a director of Albion Rovers.

References

External links

London Hearts profile

1921 births
2005 deaths
Footballers from North Lanarkshire
Scottish footballers
Scotland international footballers
Scotland wartime international footballers
Scottish expatriate footballers
Expatriate footballers in Colombia
Scottish expatriate sportspeople in Colombia
Scottish Football League players
Airdrieonians F.C. (1878) players
Arsenal F.C. wartime guest players
Tottenham Hotspur F.C. players
Heart of Midlothian F.C. players
Millonarios F.C. players
Dundee F.C. players
Kilmarnock F.C. players
St Mirren F.C. players
Categoría Primera A players
Scottish football managers
Ayr United F.C. managers
St Mirren F.C. managers
Albion Rovers F.C. managers
Scottish Football League representative players
Scottish Football League managers
Brentford F.C. wartime guest players
Association football forwards
Kirkintilloch Rob Roy F.C. players
Scottish Junior Football Association players